Apno Ke Liye Geeta Ka Dharmayudh is an Indian television drama series that aired on Zee TV. It is the story of Geeta, a timid girl who changes into an avenging fury when her whole family is implicated in a false case of domestic violence. Geeta stands up for truth and fights to restore her family's honour.

Cast
Sargun Mehta as Geeta Bhagat
Nikhil Chaddha as Prince, Geeta's husband
Shalini Arora as Mrs. Bhagat, Geeta's mother
Ravi Jhankal as Dr. Bhagat, Geeta's father
Kanan Malhotra as Prateek Bhagat, Geeta's brother
Urvashi Dholakia as Malini Yadav, Prince's mother who tries to ruin the Bhagat family
Mamta Chaturya as Asha, Prince's sister who marries Prateek after he loses his first wife
Shagun Ajmani as Kamya, Prince's sister, married to Geeta's second brother Rahul
Krip Suri as Raghu
Monalika Bhonsle as Sudha

References

External links
Apno Ke Liye Geeta Ka Dharmayudh Official Site on Zee TV India

Zee TV original programming
Indian drama television series
Indian television soap operas
2010 Indian television series debuts
2011 Indian television series endings